Stephen D. Crocker (born October 15, 1944) is an Internet pioneer. In 1969, he created the ARPA "Networking Working Group" and the Request for Comments series. He served as chair of the board of the Internet Corporation for Assigned Names and Numbers (ICANN) from 2011 through 2017.

Education 
Steve Crocker attended Van Nuys High School, as did Vint Cerf and Jon Postel. Crocker received his bachelor's degree (1968) and PhD (1977) from the University of California, Los Angeles.

Career 
He has worked in the Internet community since its inception. He was instrumental in creating the ARPA "Network Working Group" and the instigator of the Request for Comment (RFC) series, authoring the first RFC and many more. As a UCLA graduate student in the 1960s, he was part of the team that developed the protocols for the ARPANET which were the foundation for today's Internet. 

While at UCLA Crocker taught an extension course on computer programming (for the IBM 7094 mainframe computer).  The class was intended to teach digital processing and assembly language programming to high school teachers, so that they could offer such courses in their high schools.  A number of high school students were also admitted to the course, to ensure that they would be able to understand this new discipline.  Crocker was also active in the newly formed UCLA Computer Club.

Crocker has been a program manager at Defense Advanced Research Projects Agency (DARPA), a senior researcher at USC's Information Sciences Institute, founder and director of the Computer Science Laboratory at The Aerospace Corporation and a vice president at Trusted Information Systems. In 1994, Crocker was one of the founders and chief technology officer of CyberCash, Inc. In 1998, he founded and ran Executive DSL, a DSL-based ISP. In 1999 he cofounded and was CEO of Longitude Systems. He is currently CEO of Shinkuro, a research and development company.

The Networking Working Group RFC's provided the context in which the IETF was created in 1986. He has been an IETF security area director, a member of the Internet Architecture Board, chair of the ICANN Security and Stability Advisory Committee, board member and chairman of ICANN, a board member of the Internet Society and numerous other Internet-related volunteer positions.

Awards 
For his work on the Internet, Crocker was awarded the 2002 IEEE Internet Award. In 2012, Crocker was inducted into the Internet Hall of Fame by the Internet Society.

See also 

 List of Internet pioneers

References

External links

 RFC 1, Host Software, S. Crocker, April 1969.
 RFC 1776, The Address is the Message, S. Crocker, April 1, 1995.
 Shinkuro.com executive team info
 Oral history interview with Stephen Crocker, Charles Babbage Institute, University of Minnesota.  Crocker discusses computer networks, artificial intelligence research, and his work at the Defense Advanced Research Projects Agency (DARPA); interactions with other DARPA personnel including Cordell Green, Barry Wessler, Larry Roberts, Bob Kahn, and David Russell. He discusses his work as a program manager in the Information Processing Techniques Office (IPTO).

Computer systems researchers
Living people
1944 births
University of California, Los Angeles alumni
Request for Comments
Internet pioneers
Van Nuys High School alumni